Nyodes is a genus of moths of the family Noctuidae described by Bernard Laporte in 1970. Most species occur in Africa.

Some species of this genus are:
Nyodes acatharta Hampson, 1913
Nyodes argentea (Berio, 1970)
Nyodes auriferoides Laporte, 1972
Nyodes aurora Laporte, 1972
Nyodes bafouti Laporte, 1972
Nyodes barlowi Laporte, 1972
Nyodes barnsi (A. E. Prout, 1921)
Nyodes basilewskyi Laporte, 1972
Nyodes bergeri Laporte, 1973
Nyodes bernardii Laporte, 1970
Nyodes biardi Laporte, 1984
Nyodes brevicornis (Walker, 1857)
Nyodes bryodes (D. S. Fletcher, 1961)
Nyodes callichlora (D. S. Fletcher, 1961)
Nyodes chlorobapta (D. S. Fletcher, 1961)
Nyodes dargei Laporte, 1972
Nyodes diffusa Laporte, 1973
Nyodes dufayi Laporte, 1970
Nyodes fletcheri Laporte, 1970
Nyodes gabonensis Laporte, 1970
Nyodes gazelli Laporte, 1973
Nyodes hecqui Laporte, 1972
Nyodes herbuloti Laporte, 1973
Nyodes isabellae Laporte, 1971
Nyodes jucunda Laporte, 1973
Nyodes kilimandjaronis Laporte, 1979
Nyodes lemairei Laporte, 1972
Nyodes lowai Laporte, 1973
Nyodes lutescens (Herrich-Schäffer, 1854)
Nyodes makokoui Laporte, 1970
Nyodes marginata Laporte, 1977
Nyodes mariae Laporte, 1972
Nyodes marmorata (Berio, 1970)
Nyodes mochlosema (D. S. Fletcher, 1961)
Nyodes nigriodes Laporte, 1977
Nyodes njombei Laporte, 1972
Nyodes ochrargyra (Mabille, 1900)
Nyodes panconita (D. S. Fletcher, 1961)
Nyodes paulis Laporte, 1973
Nyodes pelletieri Laporte, 1971
Nyodes petersi Laporte, 1971
Nyodes prasinodes (A. E. Prout, 1921)
Nyodes punctata (Gaede, 1934)
Nyodes punctatoides Laporte, 1973
Nyodes punctifera Laporte, 1973
Nyodes rufifusa (Hampson, 1918)
Nyodes rufifusoides Laporte, 1973
Nyodes sandersi Laporte, 1972
Nyodes semliki Laporte, 1971
Nyodes sophiae Laporte, 1970
Nyodes steeli Laporte, 1971
Nyodes subfuscata (Berio, 1970)
Nyodes sublutescens Laporte, 1972
Nyodes subnigra Laporte, 1973
Nyodes succincta Berio, 1973
Nyodes suppurifera (Berio, 1970)
Nyodes tamsi Laporte, 1973
Nyodes thomae (A. E. Prout, 1927)
Nyodes toucheti Laporte, 1973
Nyodes viettei Laporte, 1970
Nyodes vigrinis Laporte, 1970
Nyodes virescens (Butler, 1879)
Nyodes viridirufa (Hampson, 1918)
Nyodes vitanvali Laporte, 1970

References

Hadeninae